Douglas Lawson (June 21, 1890 – ?) was an American football player and coach.  He was the head football coach at Williams College from 1925 to 1927. He also served as an assistant football coach at Columbia University and Brown University.

Lawson was born on June 21, 1890 in Winchester, Massachusetts. He attended St. Paul's School in Concord, New Hampshire.

Head coaching record

References

1890 births
Year of death missing
Brown Bears football coaches
Columbia Lions football coaches
Harvard Crimson football players
Williams Ephs football coaches
St. Paul's School (New Hampshire) alumni
People from Winchester, Massachusetts
Players of American football from Massachusetts
Sportspeople from Middlesex County, Massachusetts